Dhamandevi is a village in Khed Tehsil, Ratnagiri district, Maharashtra, India. Its population is 2,758.

References

Villages in Ratnagiri district